Blood Vessel is a 2019 horror film that was filmed in Melbourne, Australia. The film was directed by Justin Dix and written by Dix and Jordan Prosser. It stars Alyssa Sutherland, Robert Taylor, Nathan Phillips, Christopher Kirby, John Lloyd Fillingham, and Alex Cooke. The film premiered as a closing night film at 2019 FilmQuest in Provo, Utah, where it was nominated for eleven awards, winning for Best Art Department, Best Costume, and Best Supporting Actress for Sutherland. The film was released on 21 July 2020 via video-on-demand service Shudder.

Plot  
Somewhere in the North Atlantic, late 1945. A life raft is adrift at sea, and in it, the survivors of a torpedoed and sunk hospital ship. With no food, water, or shelter, all seems lost until an abandoned German minesweeper drifts ominously towards them, giving them one last chance at survival, but they soon find out the ship is not as safe as they thought.

References

External links
 
 

2019 horror films
2019 films
Films shot in Melbourne
Films set in 1945